Dorcadion gallipolitanum is a species of beetle in the family Cerambycidae. It was described by Thomson in 1876. It is known from Greece and Turkey.

Subspecies
 Dorcadion gallipolitanum atritarse Pic, 1931
 Dorcadion gallipolitanum fumidum Pesarini & Sabbadini, 2010
 Dorcadion gallipolitanum gallipolitanum Thomson, 1876
 Dorcadion gallipolitanum samothrakieanum Breuning, 1962

References

gallipolitanum
Beetles described in 1876